Mohsen Babasafari (born 28 June 1987) is an Iranian handball player for HC Buzău and the Captain of Iranian national team.

Career
Babasafari was one of the players selected to play in the World Handball Championship for Iran in 2015, the only time thus far when Iran had qualified for it. On 29 December 2015, he and his team beat Ukraine at the Christmas Cup, eventually winning 25–21.

References

1987 births
Living people
Iranian male handball players
Handball players at the 2014 Asian Games
Expatriate handball players
Iranian expatriates in Romania
Asian Games competitors for Iran
CSA Steaua București (handball) players
Handball players at the 2018 Asian Games
21st-century Iranian people